José Alejandro Aguilar López (born 24 April 1963) is a Mexican politician from the National Action Party. From 2006 to 2009 he served as Deputy of the LX Legislature of the Mexican Congress representing Tlaxcala.

References

1963 births
Living people
Politicians from Tlaxcala
Members of the Chamber of Deputies (Mexico)
National Action Party (Mexico) politicians
21st-century Mexican politicians
Municipal presidents in Tlaxcala